Porphyrosela is a genus of moths in the family Gracillariidae.

Species
Porphyrosela aglaozona (Meyrick, 1883)
Porphyrosela alternata Kumata, 1993
Porphyrosela desmodiella (Clemens, 1859)
Porphyrosela desmodivora de Prins, 2012
Porphyrosela dismochrysa (Lower, 1897)
Porphyrosela dorinda (Meyrick, 1912)
Porphyrosela gautengi de Prins, 2012
Porphyrosela hardenbergiella (Wise, 1957)
Porphyrosela homotropha Vári, 1963
Porphyrosela minuta Clarke, 1953
Porphyrosela neodoxa (Meyrick, 1916)
Porphyrosela teramni Vári, 1961

External links
Global Taxonomic Database of Gracillariidae (Lepidoptera)

Lithocolletinae
Gracillarioidea genera

Taxa named by Annette Frances Braun